Todhills may refer to the following places in the United Kingdom:

 Todhills, Angus, a location
 Todhills, County Durham
 Todhills, Cumbria